The MIT Laboratory for Information and Decision Systems (LIDS) is an interdisciplinary research laboratory of MIT, working on research in the areas of communications, control, and signal processing combining faculty from the School of Engineering (including the Department of Aeronautics and Astronautics), the Department of Mathematics and the MIT Sloan School of Management. The lab is located in the Dreyfoos Tower of the Stata Center and shares some research duties with MIT's Lincoln Laboratory and the independent Draper Laboratory.

History 
The laboratory traces its beginnings to the MIT Servomechanisms Laboratory, where work on guidance systems and early computation was done during World War II.

Known as LIDS, the laboratory has hosted several luminaries over the years, including Claude Shannon and David Forney. , the current acting director is Prof. Alan S. Willsky.

See also 
 Gordon S. Brown

References

External links 
 LIDS webpage

Laboratory for Information and Decision Systems